Piotr Mazur (born 15 October 1991) is a Polish sprint canoeist.

He won a medal at the 2019 ICF Canoe Sprint World Championships.

References

1991 births
Living people
ICF Canoe Sprint World Championships medalists in kayak
Polish male canoeists
European Games competitors for Poland
Canoeists at the 2019 European Games
21st-century Polish people